The meridian 71° west of Greenwich is a line of longitude that extends from the North Pole across the Arctic Ocean, North America, the Atlantic Ocean, the Caribbean Sea, South America, the Pacific Ocean, the Southern Ocean, and Antarctica to the South Pole.

The 71st meridian west forms a great circle with the 109th meridian east.

From Pole to Pole
Starting at the North Pole and heading south to the South Pole, the 71st meridian west passes through:

{| class="wikitable plainrowheaders"
! scope="col" width="120" | Co-ordinates
! scope="col" width="150" | Country, territory or sea
! scope="col" | Notes
|-
| style="background:#b0e0e6;" | 
! scope="row" style="background:#b0e0e6;" | Arctic Ocean
| style="background:#b0e0e6;" |
|-
| 
! scope="row" | 
| Nunavut – Ellesmere Island
|-
| style="background:#b0e0e6;" | 
! scope="row" style="background:#b0e0e6;" | Nares Strait
| style="background:#b0e0e6;" |
|-
| 
! scope="row" | 
|Inglefield Land
|-
| style="background:#b0e0e6;" | 
! scope="row" style="background:#b0e0e6;" | Baffin Bay
| style="background:#b0e0e6;" |
|-
| 
! scope="row" | 
| Herbert Island
|-
| style="background:#b0e0e6;" | 
! scope="row" style="background:#b0e0e6;" | Baffin Bay
| style="background:#b0e0e6;" |
|-
| 
! scope="row" | 
|
|-
| style="background:#b0e0e6;" | 
! scope="row" style="background:#b0e0e6;" | Baffin Bay
| style="background:#b0e0e6;" |
|-
| 
! scope="row" | 
| Nunavut – Baffin Island and Big Island
|-
| style="background:#b0e0e6;" | 
! scope="row" style="background:#b0e0e6;" | Hudson Strait
| style="background:#b0e0e6;" |
|-
| 
! scope="row" | 
| Quebec – passing through Île d'Orléans east of Quebec City at 46°57'N
|-valign="top"
| 
! scope="row" | 
| Maine New Hampshire – from  Massachusetts – from 
|-valign="top"
| style="background:#b0e0e6;" | 
! scope="row" style="background:#b0e0e6;" | Atlantic Ocean
| style="background:#b0e0e6;" | Boston Harbor – passing just east of Boston, Massachusetts,  (at )
|-
| 
! scope="row" | 
| Massachusetts
|-valign="top"
| style="background:#b0e0e6;" | 
! scope="row" style="background:#b0e0e6;" | Atlantic Ocean
| style="background:#b0e0e6;" | Passing just west of Cuttyhunk Island, Massachusetts,  (at ) Passing just west of the island of Martha's Vineyard, Massachusetts,  (at ) Passing just east of Grand Turk Island,  (at )
|-valign="top"
| 
! scope="row" | 
| Island of Hispaniola
|-
| style="background:#b0e0e6;" | 
! scope="row" style="background:#b0e0e6;" | Caribbean Sea
| style="background:#b0e0e6;" |
|-
| 
! scope="row" | 
|
|-
| 
! scope="row" | 
|
|-
| 
! scope="row" | 
| Passing 4 km west of Moquegua
|-valign="top"
| 
! scope="row" | 
| Amazonas Acre – from 
|-
| 
! scope="row" | 
|
|-
| style="background:#b0e0e6;" | 
! scope="row" style="background:#b0e0e6;" | Pacific Ocean
| style="background:#b0e0e6;" |
|-
| 
! scope="row" | 
| Passing 1.25 km east of Cerro El Roble Observatory in La Campana National Park
|-
| 
! scope="row" | 
|
|-
| 
! scope="row" | 
|
|-
| 
! scope="row" | 
|
|-
| 
! scope="row" | 
| Passing just west of Punta Arenas at 
|-
| style="background:#b0e0e6;" | 
! scope="row" style="background:#b0e0e6;" | Straits of Magellan
| style="background:#b0e0e6;" |
|-valign="top"
| 
! scope="row" | 
| Aracena Island, Isla Grande de Tierra del Fuego, Stewart Island and Londonderry Island
|-
| style="background:#b0e0e6;" | 
! scope="row" style="background:#b0e0e6;" | Pacific Ocean
| style="background:#b0e0e6;" |
|-
| style="background:#b0e0e6;" | 
! scope="row" style="background:#b0e0e6;" | Southern Ocean
| style="background:#b0e0e6;" |
|-valign="top"
| 
! scope="row" | Antarctica
|-
|}

See also
70th meridian west
72nd meridian west

w071 meridian west